Nikitin Glacier is a glacier flowing north into Stange Sound on the English Coast, eastward of Lidke Ice Stream and an unnamed intervening glacier. Named by the USSR Academy of Sciences in 1987 after Afanasiy Nikitin (? - 1472), a Russian traveler who documented a visit to India and Africa during the years 1466–1472.

References

Glaciers of Palmer Land